Clostridium colinum is a Gram-positive, anaerobic and spore-forming bacterium from the genus Clostridium which has been isolated from a chicken. Clostridium colinum can cause ulcerative enteritis in chicken.

References

Further reading
 
 
 

 

Bacteria described in 1974
colinum